Indian Shaker Church is a historic church property in Tulalip, Washington.

The church was built in 1924 by members of the Indian Shaker Church according to sect doctrine. It was added to the National Register of Historic Places on May 4, 1976.

See also
 Historic preservation
 National Register of Historic Places listings in Snohomish County, Washington
 Indian Shaker Church and Gulick Homestead

References

External links
 
 

Churches in Washington (state)
Churches on the National Register of Historic Places in Washington (state)
Churches completed in 1924
Buildings and structures in Snohomish County, Washington
National Register of Historic Places in Snohomish County, Washington